The 2001 Croatian Bol Ladies Open was a women's tennis tournament played on outdoor clay courts in Bol, Croatia and was part of the Tier III category of the 2001 WTA Tour. It was the eighth edition of the tournament and was held from 30 April until 6 May 2001. Third-seeded Ángeles Montolio won the singles title and earned $27,000 first-prize money.

Finals

Singles

 Ángeles Montolio defeated  Mariana Díaz Oliva 3–6, 6–2, 6–4
 It was Montolio's 2nd singles title of the year and the 2nd of her career.

Doubles

 María José Martínez /  Anabel Medina Garrigues defeated  Nadia Petrova /  Tina Pisnik 7–5, 6–4
 It was Martínez's 3rd title of the year and the 3rd of her career. It was Medina Garrigues' 3rd title of the year and the 3rd of her career.

See also
 2001 Croatia Open

External links
 ITF tournament draws
 WTA tournament draws

Croatian Bol Ladies Open
Croatian Bol Ladies Open
2001 in Croatian tennis
2001 in Croatian women's sport